

The 11th Milestone, Isle of Man (Drinkwater's Bend) is situated adjacent to the 13th Milestone on the primary A3 Castletown to Ramsey Road which forms the boundary between the parishes of Kirk German and Kirk Michael in the Isle of Man.

History
The area is dominated by the Ballamenagh and Shoughlaige-e-Caine farmland. This was to avoid marshland and steep inclines creating the distinctive elongated S-bend.

The original stone 11th milestone on the A3 road was sited at the corner café at Glen Helen. An iron milestone from the 1860s during the period of James Garrow as Isle of Man Surveyor-General is now situated at the northerly end of the former 'Drinkwater's Bend' as the 13th Milestone on the primary A3 Castletown to Ramsey Road.

The current site of the 11th marker post or 11th Milestone road marker for the Isle of Man TT Mountain Course has been placed at Cronk Bane Farmhouse on the Cronk-y-Voddy straight.

Motor-sport heritage
The distinctive elongated S-bend corner of the  11th Milestone  section of the A3 Castletown to Ramsey road became part of the 37.50 Mile Four Inch Course  for the RAC Tourist Trophy automobile races held in the Isle of Man between 1908 and 1922. 

In 1911, the Four Inch Course for automobiles was first used by the Auto-Cycling Union for the Isle of Man TT motor-cycle races. This included the 11th Milestone and the course later became known as the 37.73 mile (60.70 km) Isle of Man TT Mountain Course which has been used since 1911 for the Isle of Man TT Races  and from 1923 for the Manx Grand Prix races.

Drinkwater’s Bend
During the 1949 350 cc Junior TT race the popular amateur racer Ben Drinkwater crashed fatally at this point and the corner became known as Drinkwater's Bend, although subsequently the name became partly disused.

On the 5th lap of the 1961 Senior TT Races, Ralph Rensen crashed at the 11th Milestone and later dying from his injuries.

Road improvements
The corner was subjected to road surface repair work and re-profiling during the winter of 2005/2006 by the Department of Transport.

References

Roads in the Isle of Man
Corners of the Isle of Man TT